AJL may refer to:

 Ahmedabad Janamrg Limited
 Algorithmic Justice League, an organization that looks at the social implications of artificial intelligence
 Anugerah Juara Lagu
 Association of Jewish Libraries
 Associated Journals Limited